Meuthia "Mukas" Kasim (born August 19, 1968) is a radio announcer, radio personality, and entrepreneur in Indonesia. Meuthia judged in the first and second seasons of Indonesian Idol. During the second season of Indonesian Idol, Meuthia experienced a stroke and has since retired from all public events thus far.

Meuthia is married to Bimbom Barkah, head of Universal Music Indonesia.

References

Indonesian Idol
1968 births
Living people
Indonesian radio presenters
Indonesian women radio presenters
Indonesian television presenters
Indonesian women television presenters
Minangkabau people